is a Japanese author and media personality. She is a former second generation member of the idol group Hinatazaka46.

Career

Music 
On August 13, 2017, Miyata passed the auditions for new members of Keyakizaka46's subgroup Hiragana Keyakizaka46 (now Hinatazaka46). In the group, she is known for her cutesy character, commonly known in Japan as burikko, which she often demonstrates in the group's television show.

On April 28, 2022, her twenty-fourth birthday, Miyata became the first of the group's second generation members to open an official Instagram account.

On September 7, 2022, Miyata announced on her official blog that she had plans to graduate from the group due to health concerns and would be absent from the concert tour "Happy Smile Tour 2022". She did not participate in the music recording for the single "Tsuki to Hoshi ga Odoru Midnight", but appeared in the bonus content videos. On December 18, she appeared during the encore of the Hinakuri (Hinatazaka Christmas) 2022 concert to make her farewell speech and perform the song "Joyful Love" for the last time with the group.

Literature 
Miyata enjoys reading and frequently recommends books to other Hinatazaka46 members. She extensively studied the classic poem collection Man'yōshū when in university and occasionally discusses literature in the group's television shows.

Miyata's first published literary work is the short story , which is part of the collection  along with stories by voice actress Shiina Natsukawa and comedian , compiled by the literature social networking service Monogatary.com and published digitally in December 2018. She was one of fifteen entertainment figures who offered book recommendations as part of the 15th anniversary celebration of Kobunsha Classics New Translation Collection in November 2021, in which she endorsed the twelfth century short story The Lady who Loved Insects.

Voice actress and singer Kaori Ishihara's photobook Terminal, released in March 2022, features a photo session and dialogue between Ishihara and Miyata. Miyata is a longtime fan of Ishihara and had previously invited her as a guest in a Hinatazaka46 radio program.

To commemorate her departure from Hinatazaka46, Miyata's photo and novel collection book, titled , was released on February 28, 2023. It consists of five stories inspired by the Man'yōshū and photos taken in Nara Prefecture, the "capital" of Man'yōshū.

Personal life 
In early 2021, Miyata graduated from Kokugakuin University Faculty of Letters and also obtained her librarian certification. Her interests include reading classical literature and collecting . She respects Akane Moriya, a former member of Sakurazaka46.

Discography

Keyakizaka46 Singles

Keyakizaka46 Albums 
The songs listed below are not included in any singles above.

Hinatazaka46 Singles

Hinatazaka46 Albums 
The songs listed below are not included in any singles above.

Videography

Video albums

Bibliography

References

External links 
  

1998 births
Living people
Japanese women singers
Kokugakuin University alumni
21st-century Japanese women writers
Hinatazaka46 members